Tilorone (trade names Amixin, Lavomax and others) is the first recognized synthetic, small molecular weight compound that is an orally active interferon inducer. It is used as an antiviral drug in some countries which do not require double-blind placebo-controlled studies, including Russia. It is effective against Ebola virus in mice.

Pharmacology
Tilorone activates the production of interferon.

References

Antiviral drugs
Fluorenones
Phenol ethers
Diethylamino compounds